Tissue image cytometry or tissue cytometry is a method of digital histopathology and combines classical digital pathology (glass slides scanning and virtual slide generation) and computational pathology (digital analysis) into one integrated approach with solutions for all kinds of diseases, tissue and cell types as well as molecular markers and corresponding staining methods to visualize these markers. Tissue cytometry uses virtual slides as they can be generated by multiple, commercially available slide scanners, as well as dedicated image analysis software – preferentially including machine and deep learning algorithms. Tissue cytometry enables cellular analysis within thick tissues, retaining morphological and contextual information, including spatial information on defined cellular subpopulations. In this process, a tissue sample, either formalin-fixed paraffin-embedded (FFPE) or frozen tissue section, also referred to as “cryocut”,  is labelled with either immunohistochemistry(IHC)  or immunofluorescent markers, scanned with high-throughput slide scanners and the data gathered from virtual slides is processed and analyzed using software that is able to identify individual cells in tissue context automatically and distinguish between nucleus and cytoplasm for each cell. Additional algorithms can identify cellular membranes, subcellular structures (like cytoskeletal fibers, vacuoles, nucleoli) and/or multicellular tissue structures (glands, glomeruli, epidermis, or tumor foci).

Fluorescence Activated Cell Sorting (FACS) is a method of analysis that measures fluorescence signals on single cells, where the signal comes from antibody-mediated staining techniques and phenotypes detected by flow cytometry. The major limitation of flow cytometry is that it can only be applied – as the name suggest – to cells in solution. Although methods of “solubilizing” solid tissue exist, any such processing irrevocably destroys the tissue architecture and any spatial context. Hence, tissue cytometry complements the use of flow cytometry and fluorescence microscope in basic research, clinical practice, and clinical trials by providing FACS-like analyses on solid tissue sections (as well as adherent cell cultures) in situ. The advantage of tissue cytometry against flow cytometry is that tissue cytometry does not require the cells to be suspended in fluid, aiding in maintaining the integrity of the tissue structure, morphology, and contextual information, further assisting in precise and accurate contextual analysis that are not possible in flow cytometry.

History 
Immunohistochemistry is used in clinical practice, where tissue biopsies from every potential cancer patient are collected, fixed in formalin and embedded on paraffin. These tissue sections are serially cut in a microtome to provide thin sections, representing the diagnostic material for clinical diagnoses. Once stained initially with hematoxylin and eosin stain to detect cancer cells. Multiple marker staining is performed for proliferation, lineage, prognostic and oncogenic targets. Pathologists used optical microscope for the evaluation through the objective lenses and conclude the diagnosis by scoring the staining in percentage or as positive/negative. Visual evaluation provides a subjective diagnosis and plan of treatment. A more robust and automated system was designed to perform flow cytometry-like analyses on immunostained cells in a fixed tissue and termed tissue cytometry. The technique was introduced in the 1990s based on patents by Steiner and Ecker (CEO/founder TissueGnostics), describing a procedure for “Cytometric Analysis of Diverse Cell Populations in Tissue Sections or Cell Culture Visualized Through Fluorescence Dyes and/or Chromogens".

Additional patents were filed in the early 21st century by Hernani et al. to perform virtual flow cytometry on immunostained tissue. The latter's basics were derived from the procedure presented in 1982 by Gillete et al., describing the qualitative analysis of spectral mixtures by using factor analysis in conjunction with a spectral reference library. Following this study, Zhou R et al. published a method to quantify prostate-specific acid phosphatase (PSAP) in histologic sections of prostate tumor with the peroxidase-antiperoxidase (PAP) complex technique using diaminobenzidine (DAB) as a substrate.

Applications of Tissue cytometry 
Tumor Microenvironment: Tissue cytometry is heavily used in research to characterize the tumor microenvironment including e.g. identification of the immune landscape or tumor-vascularization, within IHC/IF-processed tissue sections. One reason is that by using this technology the complex tissue architecture stays intact and therefore also spatial relationships between cellular phenotypes and/or multicellular structures can be analyzed.

By utilizing tissue cytometry multiple research groups were able to demonstrate the impact of various immune cell subpopulations (CD4, CD68, CD8, CD20, Foxp3, PD1) on patient survival in different cancer types (e.g. breast cancer, colon cancer, gastric cancer, melanoma, non-small cell lung cancer). Since in cancer therapy a novel treatment strategy is targeting immune checkpoints (molecules that inhibit the antitumoral immune reaction), the insights gained by tissue cytometry may help to find new target molecules/biomarkers as well as to determine the best treatment strategy for patients.

References 

Clinical pathology
Laboratory techniques
Medical imaging
Histopathology
Microscopy